Nawab Shah Alam Khan (1921-2017) was an Indian industrialist, educationist and cultural connoisseur from Hyderabad, India. The main commercial venture he ran was the Hyderabad Deccan Cigarette Factory. He was also the chairman of the Sultan Anwar ul Uloom Educational Society.

Background and family
Shah Alam Khan was the son of Mir Khan (also known as Nawab Zabardast Khan) and belonged to an affluent Muslim family of Hyderabad state. Born in 1921, he grew up in an environment of relative wealth and privilege. However, he lost his father when he was a child, and his mother died when he was a teenager. His maternal uncle played a large role in raising him after the death of his father. At a young age, while he was still a college student, Shah Alam was married to Abida Khatoon, daughter of Mohammad Abdus Sattar, a successful tradesman turned industrialist who had founded the Hyderabad Deccan Cigarette Factory in 1921. Abdus Sattar had already died, and Abida, his only child and heir, was barely into her teens when they were married. Shah Alam Khan was favored by Abida's mother because he was well-educated and hailed from a respectable Nawabi family, but had little money or immediate family. The match was arranged by their families in the usual Hyderabadi way, and the marriage, which lasted all their lives, was entirely harmonious. Abida Khatoon, a traditional lady raised with thoroughly Hyderabadi values, was a devoted wife and mother who took no interest whatsoever in business matters at any time. The couple were blessed with seven children, all boys, being:

Mehboob Alam Khan, eldest son. Currently runs the Hyderabad Deccan Cigarette Factory and is a well known food connoisseur. He has at least one son, Mujahid, who is married to his cousin Nimra Fatima, elder daughter of Ahmad Alam Khan. Mujahid and Nimra welcomed their first child in December 2007.
Khader Alam Khan, second son. Married to Raffath Begum. They have two sons, Anwar Alam Khan and Zafar Alam Khan (married to his cousin Sidra Fatima, younger daughter of Ahmad Alam Khan).
Zahid Alam Khan. Married to Noor Fatima, he has four children: two sons, Manzoor Alam Khan and Qutub Alam Khan, and two daughters, Sohaila and Khizra. 
Mohammad Alam Khan. Married to Seema, he has at least one son, Sayeed Alam (married to his cousin Zikra Fatima, d/o Mustafa Alam Khan).
Mahmood Alam Khan. His wife, Najma (aged 42 in 2008), had a botched hysterectomy operation (incorrect anasthesia) at Lilavati hospital, Mumbai, in 2008. Mahmood and Najma have three children: two sons Badar (married to his cousin Iqra Fatima, d/o Mustafa Alam Khan) and Nasr, and one daughter, Maria (married to her cousin.
Ahmed Alam Khan. He is married to Uzma, daughter of Dr. Moinuddin Khan Sandozai and sister of Dr. Irfan Sandozai and Dr. Parvez Sandozai. Ahmed and Uzma have three children. Their only son, Barkat Alam Khan, married Qudsia, eldest daughter of Asaduddin Owaisi, in December 2018. Both their daughters have been given in marriage to two of Ahmed's nephews. The elder daughter, Nimra Fatima, is married to Mujahid Alam Khan, son of Mahboob Alam Khan, while the younger daughter, Sidra Fatima, is married to Zafar Alam Khan, son of Khadar Alam Khan.
Dr. Mustafa Alam Khan - married to Sara Alam Khan. They have two daughters. Both have been given in marriage to two of his nephews. Iqra Fatima was married to Badar Alam, son of Mahmood Alam, in Dec 2015. Zikra Fatima was married to Sayeed Alam, son of Mohammad Alam, in January 2016. The weddings were held within two weeks of each other.

Not long after their wedding, Shah Alam Khan and Abida Khatoon had to adjust to change on a grand scale. The end of the British Raj, the extinguishing of the State of Hyderabad and the partition of India were epochal events which shook every certainty of their lives and changed forever the society in which they lived. Shah Alam Khan was already 26 years old when the old feudal order was overturned by the Independence of India in 1947.

Career
Shah Alam Khan soon took charge of the cigarette factory, which had been faltering after the death of his father-in-law. Despite a challenging social situation, he nurtured the factory to unprecedented heights of success. The "Golconda" brand of cigarette was popular in India for several decades. It became a major money-spinner, and Shah Alam Khan, who was a sensible and even canny businessman despite his gentlemanly deportment, made intelligent investments in urban real estate, agricultural lands, a dairy farm and so on. Nevertheless, by the mid-1970s, the cigarette business was again faltering for several reasons. The tax regime was very unfavorable; cigarettes were now strongly discouraged by government and society alike. More importantly, multinational companies run by foreign-trained MBAs had changed the entire marketing paradigm of cigarettes and other consumer goods.

Other interests
Shah Alam Khan was the chairman of the Sultan Anwar ul Uloom Educational Society. He was also a member of Board of Management and Academic Senate of Osmania University. He had other interests as well. He was the founder member of Hyderabad Rose Society and was known for his intimate knowledge about cultivation of roses. He had won many awards both nationally and internationally for his rose cultivars.

Death
Shah Alam Khan died on 23 October 2017 aged 96. His mortal remains were laid to rest at the Masjid-e-Salima Khatoon in Himayatnagar at 5 pm the same day. He was survived by his wife, seven sons, and many grandchildren.

References

Indian industrialists
1921 births
2017 deaths
Indian Muslims
People from Hyderabad State
Businesspeople from Hyderabad, India